Elections to Liverpool City Council were held on 3 May 1972.  One seat in each of the forty wards was up for election.

After the election, the composition of the council was:

Election result

Ward results
This data is compared with the election results for 1969, when the councillors were elected for a three-year term.

* - Councillor seeking re-election

(PARTY) - Party of former Councillor

Abercromby

Aigburth

Allerton

Anfield

Arundel

Breckfield

Broadgreen

Central

Childwall

Church

Clubmoor

County

Croxteth

Dingle

Dovecot

Everton

Fairfield

Fazakerley

Gillmoss

Granby

Kensington

Low Hill

Melrose

Netherfield

Old Swan

Picton

Pirrie

Prince's Park

Sandhills

St. Domingo

St. James

St. Mary's

St. Michael's

Smithdown

Speke

Tuebrook

Vauxhall

Warbreck

Westminster

Woolton

References

1972
Liverpool City Council election
City Council election, 1972
Liverpool City Council election